Motu Tapu, is a  private island in the lagoon of Bora Bora in French Polynesia.
It is the located between Toopua, and Ahuna. 
Motu Tapu is located just outside the Teavanui Passage, and has the Teavanui front automated lighthouse installed, in Paparoto point on the north of the island.

History
The Island is known also as royal family island, because in former times it belonged exclusively to the royal family of the Kingdom of Bora Bora.
In 1931, Friedrich Wilhelm Murnau filmed the famous Silent film "Tabu: A Story of the South Seas", a mixture of documentary and feature film with local laity masters, on the beaches of Motu Tapu.

Administration
The island is part of Bora Bora Commune.

Tourism
The island was a private retreat owned by the Bora Bora Lagoon resort, but is currently up for sale.

Transportation

After arriving in Fa'a'ā International Airport, an Air Tahiti inter-island flight (50 minutes) will bring you to Bora Bora Airport.

There, you will need to hire a boat at the Rent-a-boat Office.

References

External links

 
Private islands of French Polynesia